"Sonne" (English: Sun) is the first single from the 2012 Schiller album Sonne with German band Unheilig and vocals by Unheilig singer Bernd Heinrich Graf (Der Graf). The single was officially released on 21 September 2012, peaking at number 12 in the German singles chart in 2012. To this day, it's the highest entry of Schiller in the German Singles Chart. The single includes the song ″Klangwelten″. The cover art work shows a graphic of the sun. The music video was shot in Spain.

Track listing

Maxi single

Download single

Credits 

 Music written by Christopher von Deylen
 Lyrics written by Der Graf

Music video

Alternative video 

The alternative video was made of sun images made by Schiller fans from all over the world. It was released some days before the official music video was released.

Official music video 

The official music video for "Sonne" was produced by AVA Studios GmbH and was shot in 2012 in Spain by German director Oliver Sommer. Director of photography was Francisco Domínguez. Digital film compositor was Danny Winter. It has a length of 4:27 minutes. The video features an unknown Spanish woman and a Spanish man. Even though Christopher von Deylen took part in the video shot, he and Der Graf were placed virtually into the music video by being shown on television screens placed in the desert. The music video was shot in the desert of Tabernas (Almería, Spain) in the south of Spain.

Charts 

References

External links
 Official music video of Sonne
 The music video of Sonne
 Sonne Alternative Video
 Sonne live
 The single on Discogs

2012 singles
2012 songs
Island Records singles
Music videos directed by Oliver Sommer
Music videos shot in Spain
Schiller (band) songs
Songs written by Christopher von Deylen
Unheilig songs